Coqsseʻleelʻee (Naxi:Coqsseʻleelʻee) is a legendary character in the mythology of Nakhi people. He was recorded in the Naxi epic Coqbertv Zherlzzoq(literally: "the record of human migration") as the ancestor of human being.

Name
The name "Coqsseʻleelʻee" include the Naxi word "Coq" (means elephant) and "ee" (means cattle), so in the Dongba symbols the word "Coqsseʻleelʻee" is written as a person with a horn of cattle and nose of an elephant. (Notice that this is the way to show the pronunciation of this name, not meaning he has an appearance like an animal.)

Legends

The great flood
Coqsseʻleelʻee was seen as the survivor from the great flood. In Naxi mythology, this disaster was caused by the filth to world which come from the incest between Coqsseʻleelʻee's five brothers and six sisters. Coqsseʻleelʻee was the unique survivor with the help of the god and the goddess.

The two goddesses
After the flood, human had come into extinction, and the god advised him to find a goddess as wife to last human: "There are two goddess lived under the mount, the one have "vertical" blue eyes who is beautiful, another have "horizontal" blue eyes who is goodness. You should select the second one as your wife." However Coqsseʻleelʻee forgot his advise and select the beautiful one, which caused his son and daughter as tree, monkey, 
bear and other creature. Coqsseʻleelʻee was disappointed and had to find another wife to give birth to human being.

Marriage with Ceilheeqbbubbeq
The god advised another goddess named Ceilheeqbbubbeq to Coqsseʻleelʻee. however, Ceilheeqbbubbeq's father, god Zzeelaq'apv, was opposed this marriage, and figured out many ways to kill him. With the help of Ceilheeqbbubbeq, Coqsseʻleelʻee overcame all of these troubles and married with the goddess at last.

There are there sons of Coqsseʻleelʻee and Ceilheeqbbubbeq in legend, one is the ancestor of Tibetan people, one is the ancestor of Nakhi people, and one is the ancestor of Bai people.

See also
 Dongba
 Naxi script

External links

Edongba Input Dongba hieroglyphs and Geba symbols.

Nakhi people